The Jersey Reds were an American basketball team based in North Bergen, New Jersey that was a member of the American Basketball League.

The team was previously known as the Union City Reds. During the 1939/40 season, the team was merged into the New York Jewels on January 26, 1940.

Year-by-year

Basketball teams in New Jersey
Defunct basketball teams in the United States
North Bergen, New Jersey
Sports in Hudson County, New Jersey